The fourth season of the American television series Arrow premiered on The CW on October 7, 2015, and concluded on May 25, 2016, with a total of 23 episodes. The series is based on the DC Comics character Green Arrow, a costumed crime-fighter created by Mort Weisinger and George Papp, and is set in the Arrowverse, sharing continuity with other Arrowverse television series. The showrunners for this season were Marc Guggenheim and Wendy Mericle. Stephen Amell stars as Oliver Queen, with principal cast members Katie Cassidy as Laurel Lance, David Ramsey as John Diggle, Willa Holland as Thea Queen, Emily Bett Rickards as Felicity Smoak, John Barrowman as Malcolm Merlyn and Paul Blackthorne as Quentin Lance also returning from previous seasons.

The series follows billionaire playboy Oliver Queen (Stephen Amell), who claimed to have spent five years shipwrecked on Lian Yu, a mysterious island in the North China Sea, before returning home to Starling City (later renamed "Star City") to fight crime and corruption as a secret vigilante whose weapon of choice is a bow and arrow. In the fourth season, Oliver and Felicity try and start a new life in Ivy Town, but return to the city, now renamed Star City, when a terrorist group known as H.I.V.E., headed by the mystically enhanced Damien Darhk (Neal McDonough), is attacking the city. Oliver resumes vigilantism under the new moniker of "Green Arrow". John discovers his brother Andy (Eugene Byrd) is alive and a H.I.V.E. soldier; Thea works with Oliver as "Speedy", but with a violent temper; Laurel attempts to resurrect Sara using the Lazarus Pit; and Curtis Holt (Echo Kellum) aids Felicity and the team. Oliver's life as a vigilante and with Felicity are complicated by his mayoral run and the discovery of the existence of his son, William (Jack Moore). Laurel dies in a fight with Damien, and Oliver discovers his plan to detonate nuclear weapons and rule the Earth's remains. The season features flashbacks to Oliver's fourth year since he was presumed dead, where Amanda Waller sends Oliver back to Lian Yu to infiltrate Shadowspire, where he meets John Constantine (Matt Ryan) and encounters a mystical idol used by Darhk in the present-day narrative.

The series was renewed for its fourth season in January 2015, and filming began in Vancouver, British Columbia, Canada that July and ended in April 2016. The season premiere received a positive critical response, however the season as a whole was received more negatively. The season averaged 2.9 million viewers each week. This season includes the second annual Arrowverse crossover with TV series The Flash, which served as an introduction to spin-off TV series Legends of Tomorrow. It also featured the first live-action appearance of Megalyn Echikunwoke as Vixen, from the eponymous animated web series, as well as an appearance by Matt Ryan reprising his role as John Constantine from the NBC series Constantine. The season was released on DVD and Blu-ray on August 30, 2016. The series was renewed for a fifth season on March 11, 2016.

Episodes

Cast and characters

Main 
Stephen Amell as Oliver Queen / Green Arrow
Katie Cassidy as Laurel Lance / Black Canary 
David Ramsey as John Diggle / Spartan
Willa Holland as Thea Queen / Speedy
Emily Bett Rickards as Felicity Smoak / Overwatch
John Barrowman as Malcolm Merlyn / Dark Archer
Paul Blackthorne as Quentin Lance

Recurring

Guest

Production

Development 
In January 2015, The CW President Mark Pedowitz announced Arrow renewal for a fourth season at the 2014 Television Critics Association event. Series creator Marc Guggenheim returned as showrunner, while co-executive producer and writer Wendy Mericle was promoted to co-showrunner.

Writing 
The season introduces two major changes to the series: Starling City being renamed as Star City, and Oliver Queen returning to vigilantism as the "Green Arrow", the same vigilante identity he uses in the comics. Regarding the latter, speaking before the season premiere, Wendy Mericle said, "It felt right for the natural evolution of Oliver's character to become what we know in the comics". Teasing Damien Darhk, the season's big bad, series co-creator Andrew Kreisberg said, "We've always referred to Ra's al Ghul [Matt Nable] as the worst thing that can happen to Oliver and his team, but when you see the first two episodes of season four, you'll quickly realize that Ra's was in the nursery compared to what Damien's got in store for everybody". He called Darhk a "different" villain than the previous ones, saying "He's a bit more colorful, a bit more fun and is very dangerous and commanding and leads an army of followers who would die at his command. But he's funnier, more charming and fits in with our whole shading this year where we've made things lighter." The season also sees many of the characters taking on vigilante codenames: Spartan (John Diggle), Speedy (Thea Queen), and Overwatch (Felicity Smoak).

Casting 
Main cast members Stephen Amell, Katie Cassidy, David Ramsey, Willa Holland, Emily Bett Rickards, John Barrowman and Paul Blackthorne return from previous seasons as Oliver Queen, Laurel Lance / Black Canary, John Diggle / Spartan, Thea Queen / Speedy, Malcolm Merlyn, and Quentin Lance. This was initially Cassidy's final season as a regular, due to her character dying in the episode "Eleven-Fifty-Nine"; she would later return as a guest star in season 5, and be reinstated as a regular starting with season 6. Colton Haynes, who portrayed Roy Harper / Arsenal as a regular in seasons two and three, returned in a guest capacity. Neal McDonough recurs as Damien Darhk.

Design 
The Green Arrow costume was designed by Maya Mani. It is more armored than the Arrow costume, eschews sleeves and features shoulder pads and archer's gauntlets, in addition to having many pockets and holsters. Diggle's Spartan costume consists of a steel gray jacket-and-pants combination along with a face-protecting helmet. In response to criticism of the Spartan helmet resembling that worn by the Marvel Comics character Magneto, Ramsey said, "I know there's a lot of criticism that it looks like the Magneto helmet. But by the time you see Diggle in action – we also get into what the helmet can do – you won't be thinking of the X-Men at all."

Filming 
Filming for the season began in mid-July 2015 in Vancouver, British Columbia, Canada, and ended in late April 2016.

Arrowverse tie-ins 
In May 2015, Amell revealed he had had discussions with DC Entertainment to portray Oliver Queen on Constantine because its title character, John Constantine is an expert on the Lazarus Pit, a concept used on Arrow. In August 2015, it was confirmed that Constantine star Matt Ryan would appear on Arrow in the fourth season episode "Haunted", per a "one-time-only" deal that would involve his character being "brought in to deal with the fallout of the resurrection of Sara Lance (Caity Lotz) via Ra's al Ghul's Lazarus Pit." As Arrow and Constantine were both produced by Warner Bros. Television, the producers of Arrow were able to acquire Ryan's original outfits. John Badham, who was a director on Constantine, directed "Haunted". On filming the episode, Guggenheim stated it felt like the production team was "doing a Constantine/Arrow crossover, and it's so exciting... we're just really glad we got the chance to extend Matt Ryan's run as Constantine by at least one more hour of television. I think you'll see he fits very neatly into our universe. It never feels forced, it feels right."

Season four includes the second annual crossover with The Flash: "Heroes Join Forces", which also serves as the setup for Legends of Tomorrow. The season also saw the live-action debut of Vixen with, Megalyn Echikunwoke reprising her role from the animated web series of the same name.

Release

Broadcast 
The season began airing in the United States on The CW on October 7, 2015, and completed its 23-episode run on May 25, 2016.

Home media 
The season was released on DVD and Blu-ray on August 30, 2016 with special features including the second annual Arrowverse crossover event titled "Heroes Join Forces". It began streaming on Netflix on October 5, 2016.

Reception

Critical response 
The season premiere earned positive reviews, with Jesse Schedeen of IGN giving it 8.5, stating "Arrow is showing every sign of addressing the flaws that bogged down Season 3", and Morgan Jeffery of Digital Spy describing the series as being "back on form".

However, the response to the season as a whole was more critical. Whilst overall Alasdair Wilkins of The A.V. Club considered the season finale to be a "perfectly decent end to a perfectly decent season", and that season four addressed some of the weaknesses of previous seasons, in particular in terms of a strong villain presence in Neil McDonough he also noted that "This season was a step in the right direction, but a proper return to past glory still feels awfully far away." Entertainment Weeklys Jonathon Dornbush summarized the season as "one that at times hinted at the promise of the show's glory days but often was almost as at odds with itself as Oliver is with himself." Overall, he criticized the lack of focus in the flashbacks, a failure to build up Dahrk's plans and motivations consistently and the lack of hope in a season where Oliver was attempting to give hope to others.

Writing for TV Overmind, Andy Behbakht criticized the decision to kill off Laurel Lance, feeling the character was underutilized and "The Black Canary was in many ways one of Arrow big hearts and seeing the show losing that character, makes the series lose a lot of its remaining magic". For the same website, Caroline Schlafly criticized the way Felicity was written throughout the season and felt that at times it gave her too much focus. However, overall she was pleased with the change in tone the season brought, and in particular praised the growth in Oliver's character, noting that, "Arrow is no longer a dark show about a vigilante who’s willing to murder. It’s about Oliver Queen and his teammates, and how they develop and interact as they fight crime and villains and Star City. Sure, right now the team is monopolized by Felicity – but hopefully that will change, and we’ll still be left with these other fantastic changes." In his review of "Canary Cry", Eric Francisco of Inverse said, "Arrow is not a good TV show anymore [...] The centerpiece series that started the evolving, expansive DC TV universe has mutated into a horrid, audio/visual white noise", and was particularly critical of the portrayals of Oliver, Diggle, Thea and Felicity in the season, along with the handling of Laurel's death.

Reviewing the season as a whole for IGN, Jesse Schedeen noted that "The fourth season made some significant strides, but ultimately failed to address the show's fundamental problem ". He praised the addition of McDonough as Darhk, as well as guest appearances including Matt Ryan as Constantine which helped seat the show within a wider DC Universe. He noted how the season suffered at times in its first half from having to lay the groundwork for spin-off Legends of Tomorrow. Whilst he praised the work of directors Lexi Alexander and James Bamford, as well as actress Emily Bett Rickards and felt the first half of the season built well, overall he felt that the season was failed in the second half by a feeling that "the writers were merely spinning their wheels before ushering in the final battle against HIVE". He was particularly critical of the narrative structure of the flashback sequences and the way in which many of the season's major plot lines ended where "the payoff didn't do justice to the setup." Giving the season a 6.6, he concluded "Arrows fourth season had plenty of great episodes but ultimately failed to come together as a satisfying whole."

Rotten Tomatoes gave the season an 85% approval rating based on 10 reviews, with an average rating of 7.55/10. The critical consensus reads: "Season four of Arrow flourishes with a refreshing new tone, a thrilling new villain, and a gripping story arc."

Ratings 
The fourth season averaged 2.90 million viewers across the 23 episodes and ranked 145th among television show viewership.

Accolades 

|-
! scope="row" rowspan="11" | 2016
| rowspan="5" | Leo Awards
| rowspan="2" | Best Costume Design Dramatic Series
| data-sort-value="Mani, Maya" | Maya Mani ("This Is Your Sword")
| 
| 
|-
| data-sort-value="Mani, Maya" | Maya Mani ("Legends of Yesterday")
| 
| 
|-
| Best Direction Dramatic Series
| data-sort-value="Bamford, James" | James Bamford ("Brotherhood")
| 
| 
|-
| Best Stunt Coordination Dramatic Series
| J. J. Makaro, James Bamford, Eli Zagoudakis, Curtis Braconnier ("Brotherhood")
| 
| 
|-
| Best Lead Performance by a Female Dramatic Series
| data-sort-value="Rickards, Emily Bett" | Emily Bett Rickards ("A.W.O.L.")
| 
| 
|-
| MTV Fandom Awards
| Ship of the Year
| data-sort-value="Amell, Stephen and Emily Bett Rickards" | Olicity (Stephen Amell and Emily Bett Rickards)
| 
| 
|-
| People's Choice Awards
| Favorite Network TV Sci-Fi/Fantasy
| data-sort-value="Arrow" | Arrow
| 
| 
|-
| Saturn Awards
| Best Superhero Adaptation Television Series
| data-sort-value="Arrow" | Arrow
| 
| 
|-
| rowspan="3" | Teen Choice Awards
| Choice Sci-Fi/Fantasy TV Actress
| data-sort-value="Rickards, Emily Bett" | Emily Bett Rickards
| 
| 
|-
| Choice Sci-Fi/Fantasy TV Show
| data-sort-value="Arrow" | Arrow
| 
| 
|-
| Choice TV Liplock
| data-sort-value="Amell, Stephen and Emily Bett Rickards" | Stephen Amell and Emily Bett Rickards
| 
| 
|}

References

External links 

 
 

Arrow (TV series) seasons
2015 American television seasons
2016 American television seasons
Television series set in 2010
Television series set in 2011